Beghin may refer to:

 Christophe Beghin
 Béghin-Say